The chapters of Rainbow: Nisha Rokubō no Shichinin are written by George Abe and illustrated by Masasumi Kakizaki.  Rainbow: Nisha Rokubou no Shichinin began serialization in Shogakukan Publishing's Weekly Young Sunday manga magazine but was moved to Big Comic Spirits when the magazine stopped publication.  The chapters of the manga have been collected into 22 tankōbon volumes by Shogakukan between April 2003 and February 2010.

The story is set in the 1950s and focuses on six junior delinquents aged sixteen to seventeen that are sent to the Shōnan Special Reform School, and their mentor. The boys learn to cope with the atrocities and unfairness they encounter there.   The manga follows the boys' lives during their time in the school and the years after they leave.

Individual chapters are called "Crimes".



Volume List

References

Rainbow: Nisha Rokubo no Shichinin